"Stand" is a song by American singer Jewel from her fifth studio album, 0304 (2003). Written and produced by Jewel and Lester Mendez, the song was released as the album's second single on September 2, 2003. "Stand" did not enter the Billboard Hot 100, instead reaching number 16 on the Hot 100 Singles Sales chart, while becoming Jewel's third consecutive number-one song on the Hot Dance Club Play chart.

Background and writing
"Stand" was written and produced by Kilcher and Lester Mendez.

Commercial release
The single edit saw no alteration from its original version. However, it was listed as Single Mix on some promotional singles, which is no different from the album version.

"Stand" was released in two formats in the United States; the CD single contains "Stand" and the 0304 track "Leave the Lights On" as its B-side, while the CD maxi single contains the song's club mixes. Both singles contained two different covers. International releases of the single received the title track and a few club mixes for its final release.

Critical reception
Todd Burns of Stylus Magazine wrote, "['Stand'] is a strong first song and while the lyrics are vaguely suspect, they can be ignored in favor of the driving beat."

Music video
The music video for "Stand" was directed by Chris Applebaum. It shows Jewel and some of the events described throughout the song's lyrics.

Track listings

 US CD single
 "Stand" – 3:10
 "Leave the Lights On" – 3:22

 US maxi-CD single
 "Stand" (Markus Schulz club mix) – 6:49
 "Stand" (Mike Rizzo remix) – 8:04
 "Stand" (The Scumfrog extended re-hash) – 7:40
 "Stand" (Boris & Beck club mix) – 6:29
 "Stand" (Bastone & Burnz club mix) – 7:12
 "Stand" (Markus Schulz Coldharbour mix) – 9:51
 "Stand" (Bastone & Burnz Del Moody mix) – 5:24
 "Stand" (Bastone & Burnz Drum N Bass mix) – 5:35

 European CD single
 "Stand" (album version)
 "Stand" (The Scumfrog Extended re-hash mix)

 Australian CD single
 "Stand" (album version)
 "Stand" (Markus Schulz club mix)
 "Stand" (The Scumfrog Extended re-hash mix)

Charts

Release history

See also
 List of number-one dance singles of 2003 (U.S.)

References

2003 singles
2003 songs
Atlantic Records singles
Jewel (singer) songs
Music videos directed by Chris Applebaum
Protest songs
Song recordings produced by Lester Mendez
Songs written by Jewel (singer)
Songs written by Lester Mendez